Wallace Birch (6 March 1910 – 1987) was an English footballer. He played fifteen Football League games for Luton Town in 1929, before having equally brief spells with Sheffield Wednesday, Accrington Stanley, Blackpool and Kidderminster Harriers.

References

1910 births
1987 deaths
People from Wortley, South Yorkshire
English footballers
Luton Town F.C. players
Sheffield Wednesday F.C. players
Accrington Stanley F.C. players
Blackpool F.C. players
Kidderminster Harriers F.C. players
Association football forwards